Route 252 is a collector road in the Canadian province of Nova Scotia.

It is located on Cape Breton Island in Inverness County and connects Mabou at Trunk 19 with Whycocomagh at Highway 105.

Communities
Mabou
Brook Village
Nevada Valley
Skye Glen
Churchview
Whycocomagh

Parks
Mabou Provincial Park
Whycocomagh Provincial Park

See also
List of Nova Scotia provincial highways

References

Nova Scotia provincial highways
Roads in Inverness County, Nova Scotia